Sab Paisay Ki Game Hai is a Satirical song by Beygairat Brigade released in 2013.

Satirical Message
Shot at a chai(tea) stall in Lahore, the song points at the undeniable power of money and the effects it has on personal ethics and different national and international issues. The Lust for money according to the song is not limited to a particular area rather it is a global phenomenon.

The song than points out that every occurrence such as foreign tours, international aid, military aid, encroachments over public lands, Corruption and even measures taken by our rulers in name of sovereignty and safety, all revolving around the undeniable strength of money.

Lead vocalist Ali Aftab Saeed said, "We tried to explore the behaviour of our rulers. It's meant to be a pun on these dynamics, we tried to make it playful also so that it doesn't come off as a lecture". 
The song received positive reception.

Video
The music video was shot in Lahore, Pakistan by Farhan Adeel

References

See also
Aalu Anday
Ali Gul Pir

Political songs
Pakistani songs
2013 songs